Bangkok Christian may refer to:
 Bangkok Christian College, a private boys' school in Bangkok, Thailand
 Bangkok Christian Hospital, a hospital in Bangkok
 Bangkok Christian College F.C., Thai football club